Elisabetta Maria Dami (born 1 January 1958) is an Italian children's book author who is famous for being the creator of the character Geronimo Stilton.

Biography
Dami is the daughter of publisher Piero Dami (who founded Dami Editore in 1972). At the age of thirteen she started out in the publishing world as a proofreader for the family business and at nineteen she wrote her first short stories.
As an adventure lover, she got her aircraft pilot and parachutist licenses aged 20, and at 23 she traveled around the world on her own and completed a famous survival course at the Outward Bound School in Maine, in the United States. Some of Dami's other adventures include taking part in a rally in the Sahara desert and crossing Africa from north to south in an off-road vehicle; she raced the 100-km Sahara ultramarathon and ran three New York marathons (in 2002, 2003, and 2017).

The creation of Geronimo Stilton
In 1990, Dami discovered that she was unable to have children. Shortly afterward she began volunteering at a children's hospital.

As she cared for the sick children, Dami decided to write adventure stories that featured a mouse called Geronimo Stilton as the protagonist. These stories became a publishing sensation both in Italy and internationally.

For a while I worked as a volunteer in a hospital, and it was there, almost by chance, that I invented Geronimo Stilton … It was at the time when Patch Adams taught the world that children need to laugh to get better. So I started to make up funny stories in which the protagonist was a clumsy mouse called Geronimo Stilton. He would get involved in all sorts of entertaining adventures, full of funny events and twists in the plot, that children found really compelling.
Since then Geronimo Stilton's stories have been translated into 49 languages and have sold more than 180 million copies all over the world.

References

External links
 "Elisabetta Dami. Fòrum IMPULSA 2012" audio-video (4 July 2012) at youtube; vimeo
 Elisabetta Dami  (11 December 2010) at la Repubblica
 
 
 

1958 births
Living people
Italian children's writers
Italian women children's writers